The 2017 Wrestling World Cup – Men's freestyle was the last of a set of three Wrestling World Cups in 2017 which were held in Kermanshah, Iran on 16–17 February 2017.

Initially the United States' team was having trouble entering the country to participate in the tournament due to visa issues. The root of the problem was Iran's counter measures to U.S Muslim Ban blocking the entry of residents from predominantly Muslim countries into United States. However after the requests from both Iranian and American wrestling federations the visa issues got resolved on 6 February 2017, and U.S team was eligible to join the tournament.

Pool stage

Pool A

Pool B

Medal Matches

Final classement

See also
2017 Wrestling World Cup - Men's Greco-Roman

References 

Wrestling World Cup
2017 in sport wrestling
2017 in Iranian sport
International wrestling competitions hosted by Iran
Sport in Kermanshah Province